The Dafer are a tribal community found in the state of Gujarat in India.

Origin 

The Dafer claim to have immigrated from Sindh, and settled in Saurashtra. The community is sub-divided along religious lines, with there being both Muslim and Hindu Dafer. They are settled in the Vanthali and Talala talukas of Junagadh District. The community speak Kutchi, while most also speak Gujarati. They are a nomadic community, migrating short distances, and have encampments at the edges of villages.

Present Circumstances 

The community are divided into a number of clans, the main ones being the Bughiya, Nathwani, Ladak, Nagori, Mori, Samma, Kharwa, Chhar, Ker, Rathore, Lakha, and Kharia. They are strictly endogamous community, marrying close kin. The Dafer are a semi-nomadic community, with hunting being subsidiary occupation. Those in the Gir Forest live in complete isolation, living in encampments in the forest. Many Dafer are now settled agriculturists. The majority of the Dafer are Sunni Muslims, but they incorporate many folk beliefs.

See also

Gujarati Muslims

References 

Sindhi tribes
Social groups of Gujarat
Sindhi tribes in India
Muslim communities of India
Muslim communities of Gujarat